The Bosque River is a  long river in Central Texas fed by four primary branches. The longest branch, the North Bosque, forms near Stephenville, and flows toward Waco through Hamilton, Bosque and McLennan counties. It is subsequently joined by the East Bosque in Bosque County and the Middle and South Bosque Rivers near Waco. The river terminates into the Brazos River, and is dammed nearby to form Lake Waco.

The Middle Bosque River adjoins the Prairie Chapel Ranch home of President George W. Bush northwest of Crawford, Texas.

Recent controversy
The city of Waco has been involved in a protracted lawsuit with Erath County dairies since 2004. The city alleges that the dairies have been negligent in allowing excess phosphorus from cattle waste to enter the river in large quantities, traveling downstream and causing algae blooms in Lake Waco. As the lake functions as the Waco area's primary source of drinking water, residents have complained for years about an unpleasant resultant taste and smell.

See also
List of rivers of Texas
Waco Mammoth Site
Bosqueville, Texas

References
 http://www.wacotrib.com/news/content/shared/tx/bush_country/stories/story11.html
 http://southwestpaddler.com/docs/brazos11.html
 http://www.tshaonline.org/handbook/online/articles/rnb05

External links
 

Rivers of Texas
Brazos River
Rivers of Bosque County, Texas
Rivers of Hamilton County, Texas
Rivers of McLennan County, Texas